Lee Hull (born December 31, 1965) is an American gridiron football coach and former player.  He is the head coach at Delaware State University, a position he had held since 2023.  Hull served as the head football coach at Morgan State University from 2014 to 2015. He played college football the College of the Holy Cross and professionally in the Canadian Football League (CFL) with the Winnipeg Blue Bombers and the Toronto Argonauts.

Early life
Hull grew up in Vineland, New Jersey and graduated from Vineland High School in 1984.

Head coaching record

College

References

External links
 Howard profile

1965 births
Living people
American football wide receivers
Canadian football wide receivers
Holy Cross Crusaders football coaches
Holy Cross Crusaders football players
Howard Bison football coaches
Maryland Terrapins football coaches
Morgan State Bears football coaches
Indianapolis Colts coaches
Oregon State Beavers football coaches
Toronto Argonauts players
Wagner Seahawks football coaches
Winnipeg Blue Bombers players
High school football coaches in Massachusetts
Vineland High School alumni
People from Vineland, New Jersey
Sportspeople from Cumberland County, New Jersey
Coaches of American football from New Jersey
Players of American football from New Jersey
African-American coaches of American football
African-American players of American football
African-American players of Canadian football
20th-century African-American sportspeople
21st-century African-American sportspeople